Waking the Dead is the fourth studio album by The Clay People, released on May 27, 2007 by Overit Records.

Track listing

Personnel
Adapted from the Waking the Dead liner notes.

Clay People
 John Delehanty – vocals, guitar, synthesizer, production, engineering, recording, mixing (4-6, 8-10)
 Dan Dinsmore – drums, executive-producer
 Brian McGarvey – vocals, production
 Daniel Neet – lead vocals, synthesizer, production

Additional performers
 Eric Schwanke – bass guitar

Production and design
 Andrew Ehrlich – recording assistant, engineering
 Neil Kernon – mixing (1-3, 7, 11-15)
 Philip Montelone – cover art, design

Release history

References

External links 
 Waking the Dead at Bandcamp
 Waking the Dead at Discogs (list of releases)

2007 albums
The Clay People albums